Elections to Brighton and Hove Borough Council on the south coast of England were held on 9 May 1996. The whole council (a unitary authority) was up for election and all 78 councillors were elected from 26 wards. With Councillors taking office only a year later after a transitional year  Labour won control of the council after controlling Brighton Borough Council since 1986 and Hove Borough Council since 1995.

Comparison with the previous councils
The wards and number of seats in each wards remained the same as the respective borough councils and therefore the swing and incumbents are all technically nominal.

Council composition
After the inaugural elections the composition of the council was compared to its previous consistent councils.

Brighton Borough Council composition after the election in 1995 was:

Hove Borough Council composition after the election in 1995 was:

After the inaugural election in 1996 the composition of the council was:

Ward results
Candidates who were previously councillors in the Brighton Borough Council or Hove Borough Council are indicated with a (*)

Brunswick and Adelaide

Goldsmid

Hangleton

Hanover

Hollingbury

Kings Cliff

Marine

Moulsecoomb

Nevill

North Portslade

Patcham

Portslade South

Preston

Queens Park

Regency

Rottingdean

Seven Dials

St. Peters

Stanford

Stanmer

Tenantry

Vallance

Westbourne

Westdene

Wish

Woodingdean

References

1996
1996 English local elections
20th century in Brighton and Hove
1990s in East Sussex